The Irish Chess Union (ICU), is the governing body for chess in Ireland since its formation in 1912. ICU is a member of FIDE since 1933 and the European Chess Union. The ICU promotes chess in Ireland and maintains the chess rating for players registered with the ICU, which are published monthly. It runs competitions such as the Irish Chess Championship and selects teams to participate in international competitions for Ireland.

In 2005, in a dispute over fees, the Ulster Chess Union (UCU), which administers and develops chess in Northern Ireland, decided to end its affiliation with the Irish Chess Union, although the UCU accepted the ICU's continued organisation of the All-Ireland Championships.  The UCU's application to affiliate to FIDE was rebuffed. In September 2018 the UCU re-affiliated to the ICU. 

While chess in Ireland has been concentrated around the major cities of Dublin, Belfast and Cork, there are also a number of clubs throughout the country such as those in Ballinasloe, Derry, Drogheda, Drumlish, Ennis, Enniscorthy, Galway, Kilkenny, Portadown Lisburn and Wicklow. Leagues are held in the provinces, with the winning teams (and runners-up) playing off in the National Club Championships (although in recent years the Ulster leagues have not participated). The winning team and runners-up are entered into the European Club Championships.

History
Chess has been played in Ireland since medieval times. Chess was played and groups met with different degrees of formality in Dublin in the eighteenth and nineteenth century, such as an early incarnation of a Dublin Chess Club from 1813 to 1819 and The Dublin Philidorian Chess Society, which was formed at the Harp Coffee House in Dublin in 1819.
Before the establishment of the ICU in 1912, chess competitions in Ireland were run under organisations named The Irish Chess Association (formed in 1885), the Hibernia Chess Association, or various chess clubs. Thomas Long who organised the 1865 Dublin Masters was the first president/chairman of The Irish Chess Association, he also helped found the Dublin Chess Club in 1867, the oldest chess club in Ireland.
The Armstrong Cup is the oldest Irish team league competition and has been played every year since 1888, perhaps giving it a claim on the longest running chess competition in the world.

Irish Chess Journal
The ICU had published magazines in the past such as the Irish Chess Journal for members of the association. In 2007, to reduce costs, this has been curtailed to a biannual online magazine. Since 2009 no journal has been produced. Junior Chess Corner was a magazine/ezine produced in 2007 by the ICU aimed at juniors and beginners.

There have been a number of incarnations of the official magazine from the ICU, such as Ficheall/Irish Chess Magazine in the 1950s and Chess in Ireland, in the 1960s.

Competitions
Competitions are held throughout the year mostly run by individual clubs or by provincial Unions such as the City of Dublin, Cork Congress (Mulcahy Cup), Bunratty, Limerick Open, Gonzaga Classic, Galway Congress, Drogheda, Malahide, Bray, Kilkenny Congress, Ulster and Leinster Championships.

A number of significant tournaments have been held in the past
1865 Dublin Masters
1892 North of Ireland Congress, Belfast
1924 Tailteann Games, Dublin
1928 Tailteann Games, Dublin
1932 Tailteann Games, Dublin
1951 Clontarf International, Dublin
1954 An Tóstal, Dublin
1955 An Tóstal, Cork
1956 An Tóstal, Dublin
1957 An Tóstal, Dublin
1957 Dublin Zonal
1962 O'Hanlon Memorial (ICU Golden Jubilee), Dublin
1988 CIMA Dublin Millennium Chess Congress
1991 Telecom Éireann International, Dublin
1993 Dublin FIDE Zonal
2005 European Union Chess Championship, Cork

Team competitions
The Leinster Chess Union run chess leagues. There are six divisions, a number of them named after significant figures in Irish Chess. The Armstrong Cup is probably the oldest perpetual chess trophy in the world played continually since 1888.
Division 1 – Armstrong Cup - first played 1888
Division 2 – Heidenfeld Trophy - first played 1970
Division 3 – Ennis Shield - first played 1926, second division prior to establishment of the Heidenfeld Trophy
Division 4 – O'Hanlon Cup - first played 1966
Division 5 – BEA Cup - first played 1972, divided into North and South sections
Division 6 – Bodley Cup, divided into North and South sections
Division 7 – O'Sullivan Cup (not running in 2017-2018 season)

In the past the O'Hanlon Cup, BEA and Bodley Cups had been divided into North and South Sections. Although geographically in Connacht, Ballinasloe have won the Bodley Cup in 2010 and 2011, the BEA Cup 2012, and the O'Hanlon Cup in 2014. Also, Ulster Club Cavan won the Leinster League BEA Cup in 1975 and 2011. The O'Connell Cup is a novice team competition that accommodates mainly Leinster teams but also includes teams from Cavan and Ballinasloe.

The Lost Knights is a new individual league tournament started by the Leinster Chess Union. Happening over the entire season, it features many leading players from the Leinster Leagues.

The Leinster Chess Union also runs a knockout team competition after the team league competitions have finished, the Branagan Cup, for players from division one and two, the Killane Shield for divisions three, four, five and six, and the William Brennan Trophy for players rated below 1500.

The Ulster Chess Union run a number of team league competitions in Ulster for teams mainly in the Belfast area. The Belfast and District Leagues Division One play for the Ulster Trophy/Silver King, which has been played for since 1893. The all-ulster league competition usually played in a variety of formats over the years so as to include sides from the rest of the province. The UCU also organise the individual Ulster Chess Championship for Ulster born players.

In the mid-1950s the Leinster and Ulster Chess Unions organised the Oriel League competition for clubs from South Ulster and North Leinster.

In Munster, there are three divisions run annually, in which club sides from Cork, Limerick, Ennis, Shannon, Tralee, Dungarvan compete.

In Connaught, Galway Chess Club is the most active holding the Galway Congress tournament, although in 2011 a Connaught Chess League was established. This was contested by Ballina, Ballinasloe, Castlebar, Galway, Manorhamilton and NUIG.

The Patrick Moore Cup (presented by the Astronomer) is a junior team competition played between Ireland and Sussex County Chess players.

Junior chess
Underage/Schools Chess Provincial and All Ireland competitions are held annually. The Leinster Schools Chess Association was established in 1942 running leagues through the school term, and holding the provincial championships over the Christmas holidays. The All-Ireland Schools Competition is usually held during the Easter School Holidays. Chess also features as part of the Community Games.

Glorney and Faber, Stokes and Robinson Cups
In 1948 a Dublin businessman Cecil Parker Glorney and competitive chess player and President of Rathmines Chess Club, created the Glorney Cup. It was joined twenty years later by the Faber Cup later renamed to Jessica Gilbert Cup. These two events have been held annually and bring together national squads from across Europe (although it is mainly just between teams from Ireland, Scotland, Wales and England, sides from France, Holland and Belgium have competed) for three days of intensive and extremely competitive chess. The 2008 Glorney and Faber Cups took place in Liverpool as part of its City of Culture celebrations.
 Since 2011, under 12 (Stokes Cup) and under 14 (Robinson Cup) teams competed alongside their older compatriots. That year it was held at Dublin City University and organised by the Irish Chess Union.
The 2015 tournament was held in Enfield, Co. Meath, and the opening ceremony was addressed by Irish President Michael D. Higgins (patron of the ICU)
Results 2013

Glorney: 1st Eng, 2nd Wal, 3rd Irl, 4th Sco
Gilbert: 1st Eng, 2nd Wal, 3rd Irl, 4th Sco
Robertson: 1st Eng, 2nd Wal, 3rd Irl, 4th Sco
Stokes: 1st Irl, 2nd Eng, 3rd Wal, 4th Sco

Hosting venues (since 2011)
2011 - DCU, Dublin, Ireland
2012 – Daventry, England
2013 – Cardiff, Wales 21–23 July
2014 – Stirling, Scotland
2015 – Enfield, Co. Meath, Ireland 
2016 - Daventry, England
2017 - Cardiff, Wales
2018 - University of West Scotland, Paisley, Scotland
2019 - The Carrickdale Hotel and Spa, Co Louth, Ireland
2020 - Paris, France (due to be held in August 2020)

Irish Braille Chess Association
The Braille Chess Association of Ireland was established in 1985 to promote Chess among the blind and partially sighted. The BCAI is affiliated to the International Braille Chess Association, the Irish Chess Union and National Council for the Blind of Ireland/Irish BlindSports.
They hold the National Championships and organise teams and players for international Competitions.

Correspondence chess
Affiliated to the Irish Chess Union is the Irish Correspondence Chess Association (ICCA) which is the 32-county governing body organising correspondence chess activities for Irish players living at home or abroad. A non-profit organisation, they run the national championship, Irish teams and other activities. The ICCA is affiliated to the International Correspondence Chess Federation (ICCF).

References

External links
 

1912 establishments in Ireland
Sports organizations established in 1912
1912 in chess
Chess
Chess in Ireland
Chess organizations
Ireland